Alexeyevka is a rural locality (a selo) and the administrative center of Alexeyevskoye Rural Settlement, Yakovlevsky District, Belgorod Oblast, Russia. The population was 1,057 as of 2010. There are 16 streets.

Geography 
Alexeyevka is located 27 km northwest of Stroitel (the district's administrative centre) by road. Krasnoye is the nearest rural locality.

References 

Rural localities in Yakovlevsky District, Belgorod Oblast